Marjan Ridder (born Marjan Luesken 3 May 1953, in Haarlem) is a retired badminton player of the Netherlands.

Career
Ridder won 17 Dutch titles. Internationally she was most successful in women's doubles,  usually partnered with Joke van Beusekom, winning at the (first) European Youth Championships in 1969, the Denmark Open in 1972 and 1975, the Irish International in 1975, and the Dutch Open in 1977. She and Van Beusekom further earned bronze at the 1974, and 1978 European Championships, and silver at the (first) World Championships in 1977 in Malmö. 
With her partner Rob Ridder she won a bronze medal in the mixed doubles at the 1976 and 1978 European Badminton Championships

Family
She is married to Rob Ridder, whose sister Marja Ridder, was also a highly successful player. Marjan and Rob's son Koen Ridder also played badminton at the top level.

References
European results

1953 births
Living people
Dutch female badminton players
Sportspeople from Haarlem
20th-century Dutch women
20th-century Dutch people
21st-century Dutch women